is a passenger railway station in located in the city of Ise,  Mie Prefecture, Japan, operated by the private railway operator Kintetsu Railway.

Lines
Obata Station is served by the Yamada Line, and is located 24.2 rail kilometers from the starting point of the line at Ujiyamada Station.

Station layout
The station was consists of two opposed side platforms , connected by a level crossing. The station is unattended.

Platforms

Adjacent stations 

.

History
Obata Station opened on July 24, 1931 as a station on the Sangu Kyuko Electric Railway. On March 15, 1941, the line merged with Osaka Electric Railway to become a station on Kansai Kyuko Railway's Yamada Line. This line in turn was merged with the Nankai Electric Railway on June 1, 1944 to form Kintetsu. The station was renamed to its present name in March 1933. The station has been unattended since February 21, 2005.

Passenger statistics
In fiscal 2019, the station was used by an average of 370 passengers daily (boarding passengers only).

Surrounding area
Miya River
Ise-Shima Wholesale Market

See also
List of railway stations in Japan

References

External links

 Kintetsu: Obata Station 

Railway stations in Japan opened in 1931
Railway stations in Mie Prefecture
Stations of Kintetsu Railway
Ise, Mie